The Frasassi Caves (Italian: Grotte di Frasassi) are a  karst cave system in the municipality of Genga, Italy, in the province of Ancona, Marche. They are among the most famous show caves in Italy.

History

Rich in water, the cave system is particularly well endowed with stalactites and stalagmites.

Near the entrance to the caves are two sanctuary-chapels: one is the 1029 Santuario di Santa Maria infra Saxa (Sanctuary of Holy Mary under the Rock) and the second is an 1828 Neoclassical architecture formal temple, known as Tempietto del Valadier.

Chambers 
The Frasassi cave system includes a number of named chambers, including the following:
 Grotta delle Nottole, or "Cave of the Bats", named for the large colony of bats that lives within.
 Abisso Ancona, or "Ancona Abyss", a huge space around 180 x 120 meters wide and near 200m tall.
 Sala delle Candeline, or "Room of the Candles", named for its plentiful stalagmites that resemble candles.
 Sala dell'Infinito, or "Room of the Infinite", a tall chamber with massive speleothem columns supporting the roof.

Scientific experiments
The cave has been used to conduct experiments in chronobiology. Among the cavers that have spent considerable amount of time inside the cave is the Italian sociologist Maurizio Montalbini, who died in 2009.

Sister caves
Frasassi is partnered with several sister caves around the world:
 Grand Roc (Les Eyzies —  Aquitaine, France)
 Wieliczka Salt Mine (Wieliczka — Lesser Poland, Poland)
 Kartchner Caverns State Park (Benson — Arizona, United States)

See also
 List of caves
 List of caves in Italy
 Bochnia Salt Mine, southern Poland, central Europe
 Wieliczka Salt Mine, near Kraków in Poland, central Europe
 Khewra Salt Mine, in Punjab , Pakistan
 Kartchner Caverns State Park in Arizona, the United States
 Grand Roc in Savoie, France, southern Europe
 Salt Cathedral of Zipaquirá, in Zipaquirá, Cundinamarca, Colombia, South America
 Chełm Chalk Tunnels, Poland, central Europe

References

External links

 Grotte di Frasassi official site
 Frasassi Online
 story of discovery

Caves of Italy
Landforms of the Marche
Show caves in Italy
Karst caves
Province of Ancona
Tourist attractions in le Marche